Church of Saint Parascheva is a Serbian Orthodox church located in Slabinja, Sisak-Moslavina County, in central Croatia. It was dedicated to Saint Parascheva of the Balkans. The Church was built in 1828 and demolished during World War II. Only the perimeter walls are preserved.

The Church is located in the center of village Slabinja, on the south side of the D47 road, towards the river Una. 

It is under the jurisdiction of the Eparchy of Gornji Karlovac.

Patron saint 

Saint Paraskeva was an ascetic female saint of the 10th century.

History 
The Church was built in 1828 based on the R. Battigelli project from 1819. It was built in baroque building style.

In 1944, during World War II, it was demolished by the Ustashe damaging roof structure, vault, interior and church inventory. After the War, ruins remained standing. In 1970, the reconstruction of these valuable buildings began, but the roof, unfortunately, was never set up.

On 4 June 2017, Bishop of Upper Karlovac Gerasim visited the church. Also, the Bishop visited the church on 16 June 2019.

Gallery

See also

 Church of the Holy Venerable Mother Parascheva
 German Opačić
 List of Serbian Orthodox churches in Croatia

References

External links 
 Official website of Eparchy of Gornji Karlovac
 

Parascheva
Parascheva
Buildings and structures in Sisak-Moslavina County
Churches completed in 1828
Destroyed churches in Croatia
Hrvatska Dubica
Parascheva
19th-century churches in Croatia